South Cove is a village and civil parish on the B1127 near Southwold in the East Suffolk district, in the county of Suffolk in England. The parish includes the hamlet of Cove Bottom.

The Church of England parish church of St Lawrence has a 12th-century nave with original doorways, and a tall 15th-century three-stage tower. The chancel is probably from the 14th century and was restored in 1877. The building was designated as Grade I listed in 1953. Today the parish is part of the Sole Bay benefice, a group of eight churches.

References

External links

Villages in Suffolk
Civil parishes in Suffolk